The conjugation of Sardinian verbs are mainly divided according to infinitives into -are, -ere, and -ire verbs in north-central dialects (including the Limba Sarda Comuna) for regular verbs, similar to the tripartite systems of Portuguese, Spanish, and Italian (all involve infinitives with thematic vowels -a-, -e-, and -i-). In southern dialects (including Campidanese dialect), these infinitives above change to -ai, -i, and -iri, respectively. Irregular verbs also exist as well. Many Sardinian conjugated forms were similar and conservative phonologically to Classical Latin, although the number of tenses were greatly reduced and the remaining tenses rely on periphrasis. 

The conjugation of Sardinian verbs split into its own article due to possible diversity. The conjugations here are currently based on Limba Sarda Comuna, Logudorese dialect, and Campidanese dialect.

Overview 
Like other Romance languages, Sardinian verbs have a high degree of inflection. However, Sardinian conjugation is rather diverse, but less diverse compared to that of Occitan. Additionally, the indicative and subjunctive imperfect tenses of Campidanese come from Latin indicative perfect and subjunctive pluperfect, respectively. Also, the Latin indicative perfect evolved to poetic preterite in Logudorese dialect, the endings are (from  >  >  >  >  > ) -esi, -esti, -esit, -èsimus/-emus, -ezis, and -èsint. Sardinian once also preserved the Latin conjugation of the indicative pluperfect (e.g. sc. derat from lat. dederat, sc. fekerat / fecherat from Lat. fecerat, sc. furarat from VL. *furaverat, etc.), but has long fallen out of use. The tenses include (periphrases are in green):

 Infinitive (infinitivu)
 Participle (partitzípiu)
 Past participle
 Gerund (gerùndiu)
 Indicative (indicativu)
 Present (presentu)
 Past present (passadu pròssimu): by adding indicative present forms of auxiliary verbs (either àere or essere) with past participle
 Imperfect (imperfetu)
 Past imperfect (passadu pròssimu): by adding indicative imperfect forms of auxiliary verbs with past participle
 Future (fùturu): by adding indicative present forms of àere plus a and the infinitive
 Future anterior (fùturu anteriore): by adding present forms of àere a with the infinitives of auxiliary verbs and past participle
 Conditional (conditzionale): by adding indicative imperfect forms of dèpere (in Logudorese and LSC) or ái(ri) plus a (in the transitional dialects and Campidanese), both with the infinitive
 Conditional past: by adding imperfect forms of dèpere with the infinitives of auxiliary verbs  and past participle
 Subjunctive (congiuntivu)
 Present
 Past (passadu): by adding subjunctive present forms of auxiliary verbs with past participle
 Imperfect
 Pluperfect (trapassadu): by adding subjunctive imperfect forms of auxiliary verbs with past participle
 Imperative (imperativu)
 Negative imperative (forma negativa): by adding no with the subjunctive present forms

The forms are mostly pronounced as they written, with the exception of forms ending in consonants are pronounced with an epenthetic vowel same as the last vowel next to the consonant, with the final unvoiced consonant being voiced intervocalically and voiced stops were further lenited also intervocalically to fricatives (cantas → càntasa , cantet → càntede ). Therefore, it is normally not reflected in the orthography, although the forms cantan, càntana, cantant, or càntanta of the  ending in Logudorese are all acceptable (forms in -nt is used here).

Example of pronunciations of forms

Auxiliary verbs: èssere and àere 
Both verbs is highly irregular, they contain subjunctive forms in the imperative forms (in Campidanese, the verb ai is missing the past participle and imperative forms). Like other descendants of Latin verb sum (see also Romance copula), the verb èssere is suppletive, consisting of Latin verbs of (already suppletive) sum "I am" in remaining forms, and stō "I stand" in the past participle. The verb àere is only used as an auxiliary verb, the meaning of "to have" otherwise is by the verb tènnere, in central-southern dialects (see § Irregular verbs). In Logudorese dialect, the preterite (see § Overview) forms of èssere is fui, fusti/fisti/fis, fuit/fit, fimus/fimis, fustis/fizis, and fuint/fint, similarly, the preterite stem of àere is app-.

Note the second source for Logudorese conjugations, the  subjunctive imperfect of essere and  imperative of àere cannot be included since these forms seems omitted by errors on the source.

Èssere "to be"

Àere "to have" 

The verbs èssere and àere always use auxiliary verbs same as theirselves.

Verbs in -are: cantare 
Verbs under this group are verbs whose the infinitive ends in -are, or -ai in southern dialects (incl. Campidanese). This group is derived from the Latin first conjugation infinitive, -āre.

Verbs in -ere: tìmere 
Verbs under this group are verbs whose the infinitive ends in -ere, or -i in southern dialects. There are slight orthographic irregularity due to being accented in the infinitive and past participle (tìmere, tìmidu) but unaccented elsewhere due to default penultimate syllable stress (timo, times). This group is derived by the merger of the Latin second and third conjugation infinitives, (a)-ḗre and (á)-ere, respective, with the infinitive form favored the third one. Similar mergers also occurred in many Romance languages.

Verbs in -ire: finire 
Verbs under this group are verbs whose the infinitive ends in -ire, or -iri in southern dialects. This group is derived from the Latin fourth conjugation infinitive, -īre. Unlike French (all pure -ir verbs are now irregular), Catalan, Romanian, or Italian; Sardinian does not make distinctions between verbs in pure -ire and inchoative -ire (whose some forms infixed with Latin once-inchoative infix -ēscō).

Irregular verbs 
Only the important ones are listed here, excluding regular alterations of infinitive stems ending in hard -ch/-gh (before front vowels), or -c/-g (before back vowels) to -c/-g before back vowels and -ch/-gh before front vowels, or accented stems as shown at § Verbs in -ere: tìmere. This section excludes the irregular verbs èssere and àere, these verbs are included at the section § Auxiliary verbs: èssere and àere instead.

Tènnere "to have" 
This verb is the meaning of "to have" when not used as an auxiliary verb (as opposed to ai), in central-southern dialects. The second-person imperative plural form uses the corresponding present subjunctive form. Pònnere "to put" and its derivatives are conjugated similarly to tènnere, but its past participle was postu instead of *pontu.

Bènnere "to come" 
While this verb conjugated similarly to tènnere, some forms has -i-, and the second-person plural imperative does not come from subjunctive present.

Fàghere "to do" 
Pòdere "to be able" is conjugated similarly to fàghere, but the medial consonant of the infinitive is -d- and the past participle was pòdidu (pòtziu in Campidanese). Còghere "to cook" is also conjugated similarly to fàghere, but the present forms containing -tz- is replaced by -g-.

Dare "to give"

Various verbs with minor irregularity

Andare "to go" 
This verb are normally not suppletive and conjugated regularly as -are verbs in Limba Sarda Comuna, but suppletive similarly to verbs like French aller and Italian andare (all means "to go") in some dialects. In Campidanese and Logudorese, the imperative forms are suppletive, resulting on forms bai / baxi and bae / bazi, respectively.

Bàlere "to be worth" 
This verb has irregular -gi- in indicative present (in ) and subjunctive present tenses (bàgio; bàgia, bàgias, bàgiat, bagiamus, bagiais, bàgiant). In Campidanese, the -l- instead geminates to -ll- (ballu; balla, ...).

See also 
 Romance verbs

References

External links 
 Online conjugator for Logudorese Sardinian verbs

Indo-European verbs
Sardinian language